Francisco Antonio Lara Uribe (born 25 January 1995) is a Chilean footballer who currently plays for Deportes Melipilla as a midfielder.

External links
 
 

1995 births
Living people
People from Linares
Chilean footballers
Colo-Colo B footballers
Colo-Colo footballers
Villarreal CF C players
Deportes Santa Cruz footballers
Deportes Colchagua footballers
Santiago Morning footballers
Lautaro de Buin footballers
Deportes Melipilla footballers
Segunda División Profesional de Chile players
Chilean Primera División players
Tercera División players
Primera B de Chile players
Chilean expatriate footballers
Chilean expatriate sportspeople in Spain
Expatriate footballers in Spain
Association football midfielders